Malcolm Colcord, also known as The Director, He plays as an important character in Weapon X comics and has appeared as a villain in Wolverine. He's a character appearing in American comic books published by Marvel Comics also.

Publication history
Malcolm Colcord first appeared in Wolverine Vol. 2 #166, and was created by Frank Tieri and Sean Chen.

Fictional character biography
Malcolm Colcord has a perfect life, being the patriarch of a family and a soldier, until he is assigned as a guard to the Weapon X complex in Canada. One night, Wolverine escapes from the complex, massacring all the soldiers in his way. Colcord does not escape his wrath and gets repeatedly slashed in the face, becoming disfigured for the rest of his life.

This horrifying moment marks the start of Malcolm's revenge against the mutant population. He becomes obsessed with mutants; his wife and children leave him, unable to recognize the man they had once loved. He seizes control of the Weapon X program, becoming the cold, ruthless and calculating Director. He presents to his superiors the idea that mutants are a resource waiting to be exploited, but inside he desires nothing less than the complete extermination of all mutants. One of his primary roles as Director is recruiting mutants such as Sabretooth, Garrison Kane and Copycat as agents for Weapon X. Colcord also recruits Agent Brent Jackson of S.H.I.E.L.D. as his second-in command, but later becomes highly distrustful of Jackson, whose cunningness is his most dangerous weapon. Malcolm hopes to bring Wolverine back to fold, and uses implants to control him and make him murder a US senator. The implants are one use only, though and Wolverine regains control. Wolverine and his friend Beast are  arrested by Brent Jackson and sent to prison. Colcord has Sabretooth kidnap Wolverine from prison and take him to the Weapon X complex, but S.H.I.E.L.D. director Nick Fury does not trust Jackson and sends the bounty hunter known as the Shiver Man to free Wolverine. They escape, but Colcord remains in control of Weapon X.

He then tries to recruit Deadpool, who initially agrees, but on Weapon X when Copycat, his ex-girlfriend becomes one of their targets. Copycat is killed and Deadpool tries to kill Colcord to avenge her death. He fails and gets killed in the process (though he is resurrected shortly afterwards).

The failure to recruit Wolverine, and the death of Deadpool and Copycat, leads Colcord to decide to bring in new members. The new line-up consists of Wild Child, Sauron, Mesmero, Aurora, Marrow, Washout and Maverick (then known as Agent Zero). This line-up is used for rescuing Madison Jeffries of Alpha Flight, who brainwashed, would play an essential role in Colcord's plans.

Colcord engineers a mutant concentration camp called Neverland, which is designed and built by Jeffries. Jeffries also designs and builds the sentries known as Boxbots, based on his old Box-armor. Using Weapon X agents, mutants would be forcibly taken from their homes and imprisoned in Neverland. There they would be separated into two groups: the useful and the useless. Those with useless powers would be disposed of. The survivors would either join the Program or would suffer painful experiments to extract their powers. Mister Sinister creates an alternate identity as one of the scientists, Dr. Windsor in Neverland, and uses Neverland to get subjects for his own twisted experiments.

Colcord later falls in love with the mutant Aurora, who persuades him to go through facial surgery to lose his bitterness. Colcord agrees, and for a while the couple lives happily together. The Director keeps Aurora ignorant of Neverland, and never sends her there during inspections. Brent Jackson points out Colcord's hypocrisy, and slyly calls him a mutant lover. Colcord, greatly troubled by this name, angrily beats Aurora. Jackson uses this moment as a chance to usurp the program from the unsuspecting Colcord. Persuading Sauron, Wild Child, Washout and members of the Underground to join him, Jackson stages a coup against the Director. Colcord destroys his face in frustration for losing his incentive, and escaps the battle with the help of Jeffries and Aurora.

Aurora however later returns the favor to Colcord, leaving him and Jeffries stranded in the middle of nowhere. Colcord and Jeffries stay underground, while Jackson takes control of Weapon X. During this time Colcord is haunted by visions of Wolverine. These visions start to talk to Colcord, motivating him and giving him advice. Jeffries is happy to see Colcord motivated again, but is unaware of the hallucinations. Colcord returns to Weapon X and decides to rebuild the Program with the help of Jeffries. The X-Men free Jeffries of the Weapon X program influence.

Colcord later rescues former Junior Weapon X Research Scientist Detlef Metzger who is about to be killed by Daken and X-23 for possessing a vial of Wolverine's blood, and recruits him for a new project, forcing him to work under threat of a nanobotic virus. It is revealed he is having children kidnapped from parts of Madripoor, experimenting on their natural human healing abilities to create a 'healing factor serum', needed to make subjects survive a recreated Weapon X Project, under the orders of Daken. When Daken figures out that he's hiding something, he arranges for Malcolm to be attacked by X-23, who takes out his finger nails, so he may capture her and use her to perfect his experiment. Before he may begin, Daken frees X-23, and together the two proceed to take out all his guards, kill his brainwashed experiments, and trap him in the lab as it explodes. It is revealed afterwards that he's alive, having taken the healing factor serum, but is left deformed and covered in burns, as it is not as strong as Daken's or Laura's. Daken allows the world to think he's dead, instead leaving Colcord chained in the back room of a run down apartment building as penance for his crimes.

In the pages of the "Ravencroft" miniseries, Malcolm Colcord is seen as a member of J.A.N.U.S.

Other versions

Days of Future Now
In the mini-series, Weapon X: Days of Future Now, a variation of the Days of Future Past, a possible future (Earth-5700) unfolds where Colcord joins the Sentinels in their extermination of mutants. Colcord's obsession is of great use to the Sentinels and he is one of the key figures in the death of the X-Men. In this series, Colcord wears a white mask to cover his scarred face. At the end of the series, Colcord switches sides. He joins the mutants in their plan to send Wolverine back in time and prevent Colcord from being disfigured, which was the real cause for the dystopian timeline. The plan fails though, but current events like Decimation have seemingly made this future an alternate timeline.

Ultimate Marvel
The Ultimate Universe version of Malcolm Colcord appears in the miniseries Ultimate Origins, as Dr. Cornelius's employer in 1946. Cornelius tells him that Weapon X project has created the mutant gene. Later, an older Malcolm Colcord appears as Nick Fury and S.H.I.E.L.D. are destroying Weapon X HQ. He tells them that men created mutants and Fury shoots him deciding that it needs to remain a secret.

What If
In What If, he was a former scientist in the Weapon X program in the 1980s where his face was scared by Miles Morales, going by the name "Wolverine". By the 2020s, he had become director of S.H.I.E.L.D.

In other media
Malcolm Colcord makes a brief appearance in The Avengers: Earth's Mightiest Heroes episode "Behold...The Vision!". He is heard over a radio at a Weapon X facility leading an advance team against the Vision and being quickly overpowered.

Colcord makes a cameo in Ultimate Marvel vs. Capcom 3. He appears in Nemesis's ending showing to Ozwell E. Spencer that he gave the creature "minor enhancements" which seem to give it both Adamantium skeleton and claws.

References

External links
 Malcolm Colcord at Marvel Wiki
 Malcolm Colcord at Marvel.com
 Malcolm Colcord at Comic Vine

Comics characters introduced in 2001
Marvel Comics supervillains
Fictional Canadian Army personnel
Fictional characters with disfigurements
2001 comics debuts